"Paean to the People" is the seventh-season finale of the American television drama series Homeland, and the 84th episode overall. It premiered on Showtime on April 29, 2018.

Plot 
Saul (Mandy Patinkin) and his team arrive at the airport, ready to fly Simone (Sandrine Holt) to the United States. Meanwhile, Yevgeny Gromov (Costa Ronin) tracks the disguised Carrie (Claire Danes), still believing she is Simone. Carrie's car is cornered, so she runs away on foot in an effort to extend the chase until Saul's plane has taken off. Saul's vehicle is stopped at a checkpoint due to an outstanding warrant for Bennet's (Ari Fliakos) arrest; Saul calls Vice President Warner (Beau Bridges) for assistance. Senator Paley (Dylan Baker), who is in the room with Warner, advises against this, as a successful retrieval of Simone would lead to Keane being reinstated as President.  Warner angrily rebukes Paley and intervenes on Saul's behalf. The plane takes flight as Yevgeny captures Carrie.

Three days later 
Saul's attempts to negotiate Carrie's release with Viktor (Elya Baskin) go nowhere. Simone's testimony confirms a GRU conspiracy to undermine President Keane. Paley is arrested as a conspirator. Keane (Elizabeth Marvel) is triumphantly sworn in as President once again, but in her first public address, she resigns. She explains that as Russia was able to exploit partisan discord in the U.S., that must be addressed and that events of her administration have left her as someone the American people as a whole will be unable to trust. Yevgeny wants Carrie to film a confession video stating that Simone was a CIA operative and that the U.S. orchestrated everything, while threatening to withhold Carrie's medication if she doesn't cooperate.  Carrie refuses.

Seven months later 
Carrie's release is finally secured in exchange for several Russian prisoners. Saul and Jim (Damian Young), the head of the CIA's Moscow station, oversee the prisoner exchange at the Estonia–Russia border. After seven months of receiving no medication, Carrie is barely lucid and even seems not to recognise Saul.

Production 
The episode was directed by executive producer Lesli Linka Glatter and written by showrunner Alex Gansa.

Reception

Reviews 
The episode received an approval rating of 100% on the review aggregator Rotten Tomatoes based on 10 reviews. The website's critical consensus is, "'Paean to the People' demonstrates all that Homeland does best, delivering intelligent closure to the season's overarching plot while fleshing out the terrible cost of victory for Carrie Mathison."

The A.V. Clubs Scott Von Doviak gave the episode a "B+" grade, concluding that it was "a mostly satisfying end to a bounce-back season", and that the "first twenty-five minutes or so is executed almost flawlessly, though, with the series’ steadiest hand, Lesli Linka Glatter, at the helm".  Ben Travers of IndieWire's rated the finale "A", writing "Homeland delivered a cliffhanger ending without sacrificing closure in a finale that sets up an intriguing end-run".

Ratings 
The original broadcast was watched by 1.3 million viewers.

Accolades 
Alex Gansa won the Writers Guild of America Award for Television: Episodic Drama for the 71st Writers Guild of America Awards. Lesli Linka Glatter was nominated for Outstanding Directing – Drama Series at the 71st Directors Guild of America Awards.

References

External links 

 "Paean to the People" at Showtime
 

2018 American television episodes
Homeland (season 7) episodes
Television episodes directed by Lesli Linka Glatter